Dasyrhadus is a genus of beetles in the family Mauroniscidae, historically included in the family Melyridae. The two known species of this genus are found in western North America.

Species
 Dasyrhadus impressicollis Fall, 1910
 Dasyrhadus longior Fall, 1910

References

Cleroidea
Cleroidea genera